Luny Tunes are a two-part producing group featuring Francisco Saldaña (Luny) and Víctor Cabrera (Tunes), which have produced many songs. Following is an incomplete list of almost every song they have produced.

Discography

Studio albums
 2003: Mas Flow
 2005: Mas Flow 2
 2006: Mas Flow: Los Benjamins
 TBA: Mas Flow 3

Other albums
 2004: La Trayectoria (Compilation album)
 2004: The Kings of the Beats 2004: La Mision 4: The Take Over (Compilation album)
 2006: Mas Flow 2.5 (Re-release album)
 2006: Reggaeton Hits (Compilation album)
 2006: The Kings of the Beats 2 2007: Los Benjamins: La Continuación (Re-edition album)
 2007: 20 #1's Now (Compilation album)

Hits
Many of today's reggaeton hits were produced by Luny Tunes. Some examples are:

Tito El Bambino's "Caile"
Daddy Yankee's "Gasolina"
Wisin & Yandel's "Rakata"
Zion's "Alócate"
Ivy Queen's "Te He Querido, Te He Llorado"
Don Omar's "Dale Don Dale"
Tego Calderón's "Métele Sazón"
Voltio's "Bumper" and many more.

Remixes
Luny Tunes have remixed several songs, which include:

Janet Jackson's "Call on Me", ft. Nelly
Paris Hilton's "Stars Are Blind" ft. Wisin & Yandel
Alejandro Sanz's "Te Lo Agradezco, Pero No" (Luny Tunes & Tainy Remix) ft. Shakira
RBD's Lento ft. Wisin & Yandel
Lenny Kravits ft. Wisin & Yandel "Absolut Remix"
R. Kelly ft. Wisin & Yandel "Burn It Up"
Frankie J ft Mr. Phillips "Obsession (Luny Tunes Remix)"
Ricky Martin's "Drop It on Me" ft. Daddy Yankee.
Ricky Martin's "Qué Más Da" (Luny Tunes Remix) (Spanish version of "I Don't Care") ft. Fat Joe and Amerie.

Albums credits
2002 A La Reconquista (Héctor & Tito)
2002 Guillaera (Las Guanábanas)
2002 El Dragón (Johnny Prez)
2003 El Abayarde (Tego Calderón)
2003 The Last Don (Don Omar)
2003 Los Matadores del Genero (Various Artists)
2003 MVP (Various Artists)
2003 Blin Blin Vol. 1 (Various Artists)
2003 Sonando Diferente (Yaga & Mackie)
2004 Barrio Fino (Daddy Yankee)
2004 12 Discípulos (Various Artists)
2004 Diva (Ivy Queen)
2004 Motivando a la Yal (Zion & Lennox)
2004 Vida Escante (Nicky Jam)
2004 Los Bacatranes (Trebol Clan)
2004 La Mision 4: The Take Over (Various Artists)
2004 Quien Contra Mí (Yandel)
2004 Todo A Su Tiempo (Divino)
2004 Los MVP (Angel & Khriz)
2005 Desafío (Various Artists)
2005 Sangre Nueva (Various Artists)
2005 Pa'l Mundo (Wisin & Yandel)
2005 40 Entre Las 2 (K-Narias)
2006 Top of the Line (Tito "El Bambino")
2008 Semblante Urbano (El Roockie)
2008 Luny Tunes Presents: Erre XI (Erre XI)
2008 Mi Flow: This Is It (Baby Ranks)
2008 El Fenómeno (Arcangel)

2002
Héctor & Tito - A La Reconquista 
 01. Yo Te Buscaba (produced with Noriega)
 02. Gata Salvaje ft. Daddy Yankee and Nicky Jam (produced with Eliel)
 03. Besos En La Boca
 07. Caserío ft. Don Omar (produced with Noriega)
 08. Tigresa (produced with Noriega and DJ Nelson)

Las Guanábanas - Guillaera  
 Vamos Pa'la Disco (produced with Noriega)

2003
Wisin & Yandel - Mi Vida... My Life
 03. Esta Noche Hay Pelea
 22. No Sé
 24. Piden Perreo ft. Alexis & Fido

Tego Calderón - El Abayarde 
 Al Natural
 Pa' Que Retozen

Don Omar - The Last Don 
 01. Intro (produced with Eliel)
 02. Dale Don Más Duro ft. Glory (produced with Eliel)
 03. Intocable (produced with Eliel)
 06. La Noche Está Buena ft. Daddy Yankee (produced with Eliel)
 07. Provocándome (produced with Eliel)
 08. Caseríos 2 ft. Héctor el Father (produced with Eliel)

DJ Nelson presenta Luny Tunes & Noriega Mas Flow
 01. All Star Intro
 02. Cae La Noche
 03. Aventura
 04. Entre Tú y Yo
 05. Métele Sazón
 06. Cójela Que Va Sin Jockey
 07. Hay Algo En Ti
 08. Bailando Provocas
 09. Motívate Al Baile
 10. Busco una Mujer
 11. Bella Dama
 12. La Gata Suelta
 13. Tú Me Pones Mal
 14. Si Te Preguntan
 15. Tú Anda Sola
 16. Tú Sabes
 17. Métele Perro
 18. Te Quiero Ver
 19. Quisiera
 20. No Seas Niña

Los Matadores del Genero
 02. Chica Ven (by Plan B) (produced with Noriega and DJ Goldy)
 03. Pasto y Pelea (by Don Omar) (produced with Noriega)
 04. Baílalo Como Tú Quieras (by Tego Calderón)
 05. Soy El Matador (by Angel & Khriz)
 06. Te Quiero (by Nicky Jam) (produced with Noriega)
 07. Me Gusta Ver (by Rey Pirin & Don Chezina)
 08. Las Gatas Se Alborotan (by John Eric)
 09. No Te Sientas Sola (by Alberto Stylee) (produced with Noriega)
 10. Dame Lo Que Tienes (by Johnny Prez) (produced with Noriega)
 11. Eres Mi Matadora (by Karel & Voltio) (produced with Noriega)
 12. Yo Soy Tu Hombre (by Zion & Lennox) (produced with Noriega)
 13. Matador En La Raya (by Angel Doze) (produced with Noriega)

MVP 
 03. Dale Don Dale (by Don Omar) (produced with Noriega and Cheka)
 09. Baila Pa' Mí (by Zion & Lennox) (produced with Noriega)

Blin Blin Vol.1 
 01. Sexo en La Disco (by Don Omar) (produced with Eliel)
 02. Villana (by Héctor & Tito) (produced with Nely)
 03. Se Activaron Los Pistoleros (by Wisin & Yandel)
 04. Aquí Está Tu Caldo (by Daddy Yankee)
 07. Dime Si Te Pongo Mal (by Jomar, Héctor & Tito)
 09. No Pierdas Tiempo (by Wisin & Yandel, Tony Dize) (produced with Nely)
 15. Tú y Yo (by Cheka) (produced with Cheka)

Yaga & Mackie - Sonando Diferente   
 02. Si Tú Me Calientas (produced with Noriega)
 03. Maulla ft. Daddy Yankee
 04. Yo Quisiera ft. Tego Calderón (produced with Noriega)
 12. Princesa ft. Cheka (produced with Noriega)

2004
Wisin & Yandel - De Otra Manera
 03. Salgo Filateau ft. Divino & Baby Ranks
 07. ¿Por Qué Me Peleas?
 10. No Sé

Tego Calderón - El Enemy de los Guasíbiri 
 08. Al Natural ft. Yandel

Daddy Yankee - Barrio Fino 
 02. King Daddy
 05. Gasolina (with vocals by Glory)
 06. Like You
 08. Lo Que Pasó, Pasó (produced with Eliel)
 09. Tu Príncipe ft. Zion & Lennox
 10. Cuéntame (produced with Eliel and Naldo)
 18. Golpe de Estado ft. Tommy Viera (produced with Nely)
 19. 2 Mujeres

12 Discípulos
 03. Donde Hubo Fuego/Pa' Tras, Pa' Lante (by Daddy Yankee and Eddie Dee)
 07. Tú y Yo (by Nicky Jam) (produced with Eliel)

Ivy Queen - Diva
 20. Quiero Saber (ft. Gran Omar) (produced with DJ Nelson and Noriega)

Zion & Lennox - Motivando a la Yal 
 03. Bandida
 14. Ahora (ft. Angel Doze) (produced with Nely)
 15. Interlude (Remix) ft. Mr. Goldy

Los Anormales
 06. Llégale (by Divino) (produced with Nely)
 09. Gata Michu Michu (by Alexis & Fido) (produced with Naldo and Nesty)

Nicky Jam - Vida Escante  
 03. Vive Contigo (produced with Nely)
 06. Chambonea
 09. Va Pasando El Tiempo (ft. Don Chezina)(produced with Nesty and Naldo)
 15. Tus Ojos

Trebol Clan - Los Bacatranes 
 03. Agárrala
 04. No Le Temas a Él (ft. Héctor & Tito)
 09. Gata Fiera (ft. Héctor el Father & Joan) (produced with Joan and Mr.G)
 11. Mi Vida

La Mision 4: The Take OverDisc 1 05. Pierde El Control (by Aniel) (produced with Nesty, Naldo and Nely)
 07. Siente El Flow (by Baby Ranks)
 08. Fiera Callada (by Varon) (produced with Mr. G)
 10. No Me Puedes Comprender (by Wibal & Alex) (produced with Nesty and Nely)Disc 2 04. El Rolo (by Alexis & Fido)
 06. Tú Te Entregas A Mí (by Baby Rasta & Gringo) (produced with Nely)
 09. Sal A La Disco (by Angel Doze) (produced with Nely and Naldo)

Yandel - Quien Contra Mí
 03. Ya Yo Me Cansé (produced with Fido)
 04. Mami Yo Quisiera Quedarme (ft. Alexis)
 06. Búscame
 07. Say Ho!
 08. La Calle Me Lo Pidió (ft. Tego Calderón) (produced with Fido)
 11. Dem Bow (Remix)
 12. Listo Para el Cantazo [Bonus Track] (ft. Alexis)

Divino - Todo A Su Tiempo 
 03. Se Activaron Los Anormales (ft. Daddy Yankee)
 06. Super Gangsteril (feat. Polaco)
 08. Tres Perros (ft. Angel & Khriz)(produced with Gocho)

DJ Nelson presenta Noriega Contra la Corriente
 03. Te Encontraré (by Tito "El Bambino") (produced with Noriega)

Angel & Khriz - Los MVP 
 02. Vamos Perros
 07. Ven Baílalo (produced with Mr. G)
 14. Ven Baílalo (Bachata-Merengue Remix) (produced with Mr. G)

The Noise, Vol. 10: The Last Noise  
 Untitled (by Baby Ranks)
 Untitled (by Wibal & Alex) (produced with Nesty)

Voltio - Voltage AC
 12. Bumper (produced with Nesty)

2005
Luny Tunes & Baby Ranks - Mas Flow 2
 02. Rakata
 03. El Tiburón
 04. Dale Castigo
 05. Mírame
 06. Es Mejor Olvidarlo
 07. Mayor Que Yo
 09. Con Rabia
 10. Sóbale el Pelo
 11. Te He Querido, Te He Llorado
 12. Mírame [Mix]
 13. Déjala Volar
 14. Verme
 15. Tortura
 17. Obsession (Remix)
 19. Fantasía

Ivy Queen - Flashback
 06. Te He Querido, Te He Llorado
 13. Quiero Saber
 16. En La Disco
 20. Yo Lamento (Salsa Version)

Desafío  
 04. En la Disco Bailoteo (by Wisin & Yandel)
 09. Baila Conmigo (by Zion & Lennox) (produced with Noriega)
 10. El Nalgazo (by Alexis & Fido) (produced with Noriega)
 14. El Desafío (by Tego Calderón, Don Omar, Wisin & Yandel, Alexis, & Tempo) (produced with Noriega)

Héctor el Bambino & Naldo Presentan Sangre Nueva  
 05. Se la Monte (by Gadiel & Lobo, Yandel) (produced with Naldo, Nely and Nesty)
 07. Bailando Sola (by Kartiel) (produced with Nely and Naldo)
 10. Nueva Sangre (by Abrante & Caiko, Tego Calderón)
 15. Sedúceme (by Danny & Chillin) (produced with Naldo and Nely)

Noztra - Ya' Aint Ready
 ?K-Narias - 40 Entre Las 2
 08. Tu Te Entregas A Mi
 09. Provocandome (ft. Mr. Phillips)

Ricky Martin - Life
 08. Drop It On Me ft. Daddy Yankee (produced with will.i.am)
 11. Que Más Da (I Don't Care) (Luny Tunes Reggaeton Mix)

El Pueblo - Del Pueblo Pa'l Pueblo
 02. Mi Linda Flor (ft. Baby Ranks & Mr. Phillips) (produced with Nesty)

Wisin & Yandel - Pa'l Mundo
 02. Manigueta (produced with Nely)
 03. Llamé Pa' Verte (Bailando Sexy) (produced with Nely)
 04. Paleta (ft. Daddy Yankee) (produced with Tainy)
 06. Mayor Que Yo, Pt. 2 (produced with Nales)
 10. Rakata (produced with Nely)
 11. Sensación (ft. Tony Dize) (produced with Tainy and Naldo)
 14. Mírala Bien (produced with Thilo)
 16. Lento
 17. Títere (produced with Nesty)
 18. Yo Quiero

Daddy Yankee - Barrio Fino en Directo 
 02. King Daddy [Live]
 05. Tu Príncipe [Live] ft. Zion & Lennox
 09. Lo Que Pasó, Pasó [Live] (produced with Eliel)
 10. Gasolina [Live]
 12. Machucando
 14. Machete Reloaded ft. Paul Wall

12 Discípulos: Special Edition 
 01. Taladro (by Daddy Yankee and Eddie Dee) (produced with Monserrate & DJ Urba, Fish and Tainy)

2006
Divino - Todo A Su Tiempo (Platinum Edition) 
 03. Noche de Travesura ft. Héctor el Father (produced with Nely)
 06. Llégale (produced with Nely)

K-Narias - Hombres Con Pañales
02. Mentiroso ft. Angel Lopez and Baby Ranks

Tito "El Bambino" - Top of The Line 
 02. Caile (produced with Tainy, Nales and Thilo)
 05. Secreto (Luny only; produced with Nales)
 07. Tu Cintura (ft. Don Omar) (produced with Tainy)
 09. Reto (produced with Tainy)
 10. Peligro (produced with Tainy)
 11. Flow Natural (ft. Deevani and Beenie Man) (produced with Tainy and Nales)
 15. Corre y Dile (produced with Tainy & Noriega)

N.O.R.E. - N.O.R.E. y la Familia...Ya Tú Sabe
 07. Vente Mami ft. Pharrell and Zion

Janet Jackson - Call on Me (Remixes)
 "Call on Me" (with Nelly) (Luny Tunes Remix)

Paris Hilton - Paris (Limited Edition, with a poster) / iTunes Digital Single
 Stars Are Blind (Luny Tunes Remix) ft. Wisin & YandelTego Calderón - The Underdog/El Subestimado 17. Cuando Baila Reggaetón ft. Yandel (produced with Tainy and Joker)Wisin & Yandel - Pa'l Mundo: Deluxe EditionDisc 2
 01. Pam Pam (produced with Tainy, Joker and Naldo)
 06. Burn It Up ft. R. Kelly (produced with Nely)Luny Tunes & Tainy - Mas Flow: Los Benjamins 01. Royal Rumble (Se Van)
 02. Lento
 03. Hello
 04. Entrégate
 05. Beautiful
 06. Noche de Entierro (Nuestro Amor)
 07. Mi Fanática
 08. Esta Noche
 10. De Ti Me Enamoré
 11. Slow Motion
 12. Alócate
 13. Tocarte
 15. Acelera
 16. Clack Clack
 17. Piden Reggaetón
 20. Tú Me Arrebata
 21. No Te Quiere
 22. Libertad
 23. Lento (Remix)
 00. Bajo la Vigilia de un Santo (by El Roockie) (didn't make to the final cut)RBD - Rebels 12. Money Money

2007Luny Tunes & Tainy - Los Benjamins: La ContinuaciónDisc 2
 01. Luny Tunes Taliban Beat
 02. Lo Nuestro Se Fue (Remix)
 03. Vete
 04. Welcome to My Crib
 05. Cámara
 06. Lento (Remix)
 07. Distancia
 09. I Think I'm In Love
 11. Beautiful (Remix)
 12. Luny & Nales Remix
 14. Entrégate (Remix)
 16. Te Toco
 17. Que Paso
 18. Ven Motívame
 19. Bien Duro
 20. Bailándome
 21. Reggaetón Ripiao
 00. Sola y Triste (by Lennox ft. Lionize from Erre XI) (didn't make to the final cut)Don Omar presenta El Pentágono 06. Mala Es (by Jowell & Randy) (produced with Miki)Daddy Yankee - El Cartel: The Big Boss 04. Fuera de Control (produced with Tainy)Tito "El Bambino" - It's My Time 03. La Pelea (produced with Noriega)Ivy Queen - Sentimiento (Platinum Edition) 04. Dime Si Recuerdas (produced with Noriega)

2008El Roockie - Semblante Urbano 02. Parece Sincera (produced with Predikador)
 11. Vigilia De Un Santo (produced with Tainy)
 14. Giales del GhettoDaddy Yankee - Talento de Barrio 05. Llamado de Emergencia (Luny only; produced with Eli "El Musicólogo" and Predikador)
 07. Salgo Pa' La Calle (feat. Randy) (produced with Tainy)Erre XI - Luny Tunes Presents: Erre XI 01. Carita Bonita (feat. Pee Wee) (produced with Noriega)
 02. Al Desnudo (produced with Nales & Predikador)
 03. La Carta (produced with Noriega)
 04. Invisible (feat. Zion & Lennox) (produced with Noriega & Predikador)
 05. MSN (produced with Mambo Kingz)
 06. Febrero 14 (produced with Noriega, Ivy Queen (in lyrics) & Tainy)
 07. Llorare (feat. Alexis)
 08. Ella Me Amó (produced with Tone & Jery)
 09. Te Hice Volar (feat. La Sista) (produced with Predikador)
 11. Castigo (feat. Guelo Star) (produced with Noriega)
 12. Llorare
 13. Dímelo (produced with DJ Dicky)
 14. Carita Bonita (Trance Version) (produced with Noriega)Baby Ranks - Mi Flow: This Is It 03. Suave (produced with Predikador)
 08. Detras de Ti
 10. Tell Me WhyArcangel - El Fenómeno 03. Él No Se Va A Enterar (produced with Tainy & Noriega)
 05. Demente Bailando (produced with Tainy)
 06. Agresivo 3 (ft. J-King) (produced with Hyde & DJ Coffie)

2009Wisin & Yandel - La Revolución 14. Besos Mojados (produced with Victor "El Nasi")
 15. Descara (Remix) (ft. Yomo) (produced with Nesty, Victor, DJ Memo & Haze)Ana Bárbara - Rompiendo Cadenas   
 04. Rompiendo Cadenas (ft. Dyland & Lenny)

2010Ivy Queen - Drama Queen 07. Acercate (ft. Wisin & Yandel) (Produced with Tainy)
 10. Cosas De La Vida (ft. Frank Reyes) (Produced with Lenny Santos)
 13. La Vida Es Así - Bachata Version (Produced with Tainy)Ivy Queen - Drama Queen Deluxe Edition 03. Aya Aya

2011

2012Farruko  - The Most Powerful RookieFeel the RhythmJ Álvarez - Imperio Nazza: J Álvarez Edition 
No Me Hagas Esperar (produced with Musicólogo & Menes)
Nos Matamos Bailando (ft. Daddy Yankee) (produced with Musicólogo & Menes)
Una Noche Más (ft. Franco El Gorila) (produced with Musicólogo & Menes)Daddy Yankee  - Prestige 
Limbo (Luny only, produced with MadMusick)

2013Dyland & Lenny  - My World 2 
02. Más No Puedo Amarte
03. Darte Lo Tuyo (ft. J Álvarez) (produced with Swifft)
06. La Cura (ft. Yomo) (produced with Swifft)
07. Que Vuele (ft. Víctor Manuelle)
08. El Juego (ft. Cosculluela) (produced with Tainy)
09. Sólo Palabras (produced with Predikador)
10. Sin Tu Amor (ft. Ángel López) (produced with Predikador)Yandel  - De Líder a Leyenda 
07. Moviendo Caderas (ft. Daddy Yankee) (produced with MadMusick & Predikador)Víctor Manuelle  - Me Llamaré Tuyo 
07. No Vuelvo (ft. Ken-Y) (produced with Noriega)
09. Tiempo al Tiempo (produced with Noriega)J-King & Maximan  - Los Sucesores 
09. Amor Cibernético

2014Wisin - El Regreso del Sobreviviente02. Mucho Bajo
03. Adrenalina (ft. Jennifer Lopez & Ricky Martin) (produced with Chris Jeday & MadMusick)
04. Adicto
05. Heavy Heavy (ft. Tempo) (produced with Predikador & Hyde)
10. Que Viva la Vida (produced with Predikador)
13. Que Viva la Vida (ft. Michel Teló) (produced with Predikador)Alexis & Fido  - La Esencia03. Algaretismo
04. Sudao (ft. Zion & Lennox) (produced with Predikador)
06. Alócate (produced with MadMusick & Predikador)
15. Rompe la Cintura (produced with MadMusick)Plan B  - Love & Sex02. Choca
14. Candy (produced with DJ Duran)
15. Sátiro (ft. Amaro)
16. Love and Sex  (produced with DJ Duran)

2015Yandel - Dangerous'
15. Tu Cura (ft. Gadiel)
16. Riversa (ft. De La Ghetto) (produced with Predikador)

References

See also
Luny Tunes
Mas Flow Inc
Noriega
Noriega production discography
DJ Nelson

Production discographies
Luny Tunes discography
Hip hop discographies
Albums produced by Luny Tunes
Reggaeton discographies